Sergio Valle Duarte (born September 26, 1954) is a Brazilian multimedia artist and fine-art photographer.

Biography
Self-taught, he lives and works in Sao Paulo. Between 1972 and 1974, he worked as an actor in television advertisements for Campari and Nestle. 

 
Due to the military dictatorship in Brazil, in 1976 he moved to London where he worked as assistant to Rex Features International Photographic Press Agency.

As freelance photographer, he followed pop music groups The Who, Tangerine Dream, Genesis, Deep Purple, and ZZ Top. In 1977 Brazilian magazine Geração Pop (Editora Abril) featured a series of pictures he made in London of The Rolling Stones. Soon after, between Europe and South America, he collaborated with a range of magazines, Interview, Playboy, Vogue, Sony Style, (1978–1990). In those years he joined The Image Bank, Getty Images (1980–2005) and was featured in photography art magazines Collector's Photography U.S.A., Zoom France, Special Bresil, Zoom Italy, Newlook France, Newlook USA, and Playboy (Brazil).

As Multimedia artist,  since 1970, he participated in the exhibition New Media Art Multimedia 70/80 with the triptych "Video Oil" at the Armando Alvares Penteado Foundation, curated by Deysi Piccinini, also the exhibition The plot of Taste another look at the daily, at the Julio Plaza installation Electronic Amusement with the project "Video Hypnosis" at the Biennial Foundation, São Paulo, 1985 and The First Quadrienal de Fotografias, curated by Paulo Klein at Museu de Arte Moderna de São Paulo, 1985. Duarte evolved his work adding new technologies and techniques with digital images, electrophotography, Xerox art conceptualizing artistically the reading of DNA and also in the future, the writing of DNA. To his portraits he sewed strands of hair of the models to allow them a future cloning.

The model Gianne Albertoni is a part of the series that is featured in the permanent collection of museums in Europe and South America. The series is denominated by the artist as "Eletrografias e Fotografias com Fios de Cabelo para Futura Clonagem" (Electrophotographs and Photographs with Human Hair for Future Cloning), BioArt.

Duarte is inspired by the surrealist tradition and the originality of his work resides in the fantastic colors and in the richness of details that he uses. Irreverent, but never dramatic, with a playful irony, Duarte's works are constantly moving, dancing, flying, stretching, as if they are to expand out of the frame.

During the 1980s, he befriended the Italian artist and philosopher Joseph Pace, founder in Paris of Filtranisme, a neo-existential philosophical and artistic current, joining, in 1990, the enlarged "filtranistes" group.

Due to a leak in the roof of his artist studio at Spring Street during a summer storm in the late 1990s, much of his work was destroyed; it is rare to find analog works before this period.

He authenticates his works with a thumbprint.

Duarte focuses his personal expression interpreting freely sacred and profane themes. From 2005 to 2015 he collaborated as curator for Brazil for the Florence Biennale  and for the Padua Art Fair.

Collections 
 Sao Paulo Museum of Modern Art, Brazil
 Itaú Cultural, Sao Paulo, Brazil
 Museum of Modern Art, Rio de Janeiro, Rio de Janeiro, Brazil
 Yokohama Museum of Art, Yokohama, Japan
 Musée de l'Élysée,  Lausanne, Switzerland
 Museum für Fotokopie, Mülheim, Germany
 Auer Photo Foundation, Geneva, Switzerland
 Museum Afro Brasil, Sao Paulo, Brazil
 Musée Français de la Photographie, Bievres, France
 Museum of Art of the Parliament of São Paulo, Brazil

Gallery

Selected bibliography
 Art Director's Index to Photographers Volume 7, 1981, pages 202-203   
 Art Director's Index to Photographers Volume 8, 1982, pages 312-313   
 Arteder , Muestra Internacional de Obra Grafica, Bilbao, Catalogo, 19 mar 1982 p. 154, 155, (Spain).
 Arlindo Machado, "Sergio Valle Duarte, as fantásticas paisagens dos sonhos", Folha de S.Paulo, 07 set. 1984, Ilustrada, p. 38 (Brazil).
 Art Director's Index to Photographers Volume 10, 1985, pages 292-293   
 Arlindo Machado, " Os fantasmas e a realidade", Folha de Sao Paulo, Mar 6, 1985, Fotografia Critica, p. 45, (Brazil).
 Robert Louit " Portifolio Revista Zoom Internacional", 1985, edição 121, p. 26,27,28,29,30,31, França.
 Daysi Peccinini – "Arte Meios Multimeios 70/80" FAAP – Projeto Video Oil,1985,(Brazil).   
 Art Director's Index to Photographers Volume 11, 1986, pages 192- 193    
 Renato Janine Ribeiro "Um televerão", Folha de Sao Paulo, 04 de maio. 1986, Folhetim p. 2, (Brazil).
 José Américo Motta Pessanha"  Imagem do corpo nu", Catalogo Funarte 1986, p. 25, 27, (Brazil).
 Ana Maria Guariglia, " Em fotos,  união exótica de rostos e flores", Folha de Sao Paulo, 03 fev. 1988, Informatica p. 12, (Brazil).
 Art Director's Index to Photographers Volume 14, 1989, pages 136-137  
 Pepe Escobar " Reflexos de Sao Paulo em Amsterdã" O Estado de Sao Paulo, Jun 20, 1989, Caderno 2, p.  66, (Brazil).
 NRC Handelsblad, " Musea", 21 junho 1989, p. 6,(Netherlands).
 Sadahiro Suzuki "World Photographic Exhibition" Catalogo, 1989. p. 54, (Japan).
 Klaus Urbons " Kunst und design mit dem Fotokopierer", DuMont Buchverlag,Kolm 1991, p. 164, 165, image 38, (Germany).   
 Reynaldo Roels Jr. "Arte Erótica", Catalog Museum of Modern Art, Rio de Janeiro, 1993, p. 15 Brasil.
 Klaus Urbons " Elektrografie analog und digitale bilder", DuMont Buchverlag Kolm, 1994, p. 136 image 37, (Germany).  
 Paola Sammartano " Portifolio Revista Zoom Internacional" 1995, p. 62, 63, 64, 65, 66, 67, (Italy).
 Ivo Mesquita, Tadeu Chiarelli, Ricardo Mendes" Fotografias no acervo do Museu de Arte Moderna de Sao Paulo", 2002, p. 30, 31, (Brazil).
 Tadeu Chiarelli "Catalog geral do acervo do Museu de Arte Moderna de Sao Paulo", 2002, p. 85, 86, 87, 88, 89, (Brazil).
 Coleção Joaquim Paiva, "Visões e Alumbramentos" Museum of Modern Art, Rio de Janeiro", 2002, (Brazil).   
 Eduardo Bueno "São Paulo 450 anos em 24 horas", Bueno e Bueno 2004, p. 21, 22, 23, 197, (Brazil).
 Florençe Biennale, "Catalog",2007, p. 748, (Italy).
 Emanuel Araújo " Esteticas, sueños utopias de los artistas de Brasil por la libertad", Imprensa Oficial 2010 p. 110, 124, (Brazil).  
 João j. Spinelli " Alex Vallauri Graffiti" Editora Bei, 2010 flap p. 176, 177, (Brazil).   
 Florence Biennale,"Catalog", 2011, p. 477,(Italy).

References

1954 births
20th-century Brazilian artists
20th-century Brazilian male artists
20th-century photographers
Multimedia artists
Fine art photographers
BioArtists
Xerox artists
Living people
Brazilian photographers